The Northern Ohio School is a historic school building at 60 Arkansas Highway 184 in Parkin, Arkansas.  It is a small wood-frame structure, clad in clapboards, with a corrugated metal roof, set on the south side of the highway just beyond the northern boundary of Parkin Archeological State Park.  The school was built c. 1910 by the Northern Ohio Cooperage and Lumber Company as an educational facility for the children of its African-American workers.  The building was converted to a residence in 1951 after the company closed down its operations.  It was sold to the state, as a buffer property for the adjacent park, in 1998.

The building was listed on the National Register of Historic Places in 2014.

It appears to be a one-room schoolhouse building.

See also
National Register of Historic Places listings in Cross County, Arkansas

References

School buildings on the National Register of Historic Places in Arkansas
One-room schoolhouses in Arkansas
School buildings completed in 1910
Buildings and structures in Cross County, Arkansas
National Register of Historic Places in Cross County, Arkansas